Jari Ecological Station is an ecological station in Brazil, located in the states of Amapá and Pará, created in 1984.

Location

The Jari Ecological Station lies in the municipalities of Almeirim, Pará, and Mazagão, Amapá.
It lies in the Uatuma-Trombetas moist forests ecoregion of the Amazon biome.
The Jari River drains the eastern part and the Paru River drains the south west part.
In north west the main watercourse is the Carecuru River.
The reserve is bounded by the Paru State Forest to the north, and the Rio Iratapuru Sustainable Development Reserve to the northeast.

Environment

The vegetation is mainly land forest.
Emergent trees reach .
The protected unit is in excellent condition. 
There are traces of two old mines, which caused some changes to the landscape.
Small numbers of people have settled along the Jarí River, which flows through the unit, built houses and cleared fields.
The climate is hot and humid, with high annual rainfall.
Flora and fauna are typical of tropical rainforest.
Illegal gold prospecting occurs in the areas around the unit and pose the greatest threat through water pollution and hunting of local fauna, particularly mammals.

History

It is administered by the Chico Mendes Institute for Biodiversity Conservation.
The Ecological Station is a "strict nature reserve" under IUCN protected area category Ia.
The purpose is to preserve the ecosystem and to support research and environmental education.
It is part of the Amapá Biodiversity Corridor, created in 2003.

The limits of the ESEC were altered by decree 89.440 of 13 April 1984.
The consultative council was created on 27 February 2014.
As of 2016 it was supported by the Amazon Region Protected Areas Program.

References

Sources

1982 establishments in Brazil
Ecological stations of Brazil
Protected areas of Amapá
Protected areas of Pará
Protected areas established in 1982